The Congressional Club (founded in 1908) is an historic clubhouse located at 2001 New Hampshire Avenue NW, Washington, D.C., in the U Street Corridor. The organization it hosts, which is the official club of congressional spouses, was created in May 1908 with the Sixtieth Congress passage of HR22029. The Congressional Club is the only club in the world to be incorporated by an act of Congress. 
Since 1912, the club has hosted a luncheon honoring the First Lady of the United States. It is the largest annual event sponsored by the Club.

House
Built in 1917, the neoclassical clubhouse is designated a contributing property to the Sixteenth Street Historic District, an historic district listed on the National Register of Historic Places in 1978.  The building was individually listed on the Register in 2011.  Designed by George Oakley Totten Jr., the building is a clubhouse for congressional spouses.  As part of her effort to enhance the area of 16th Street near her stone mansion, nicknamed Henderon Castle, Mary Foote Henderson played a large role in the design and location of the building.

Cookbook
The major fundraiser of the club is the Congressional Club Cookbook, or C3. It contains recipes from the members, for example Bess Truman's Ozark pudding.

See also
 National Register of Historic Places listings in Washington, D.C.

References

External links

Official website

Buildings and structures completed in 1914
Clubhouses on the National Register of Historic Places in Washington, D.C.
Clubs and societies in Washington, D.C.
Individually listed contributing properties to historic districts on the National Register in Washington, D.C.
Neoclassical architecture in Washington, D.C.